Robert Laurence Albert Simpson, known professionally as Ronny Jordan (29 November 1962 – 13 January 2014) was a British guitarist and part of the acid jazz movement at the end of the twentieth century. Jordan described his music as "urban jazz", a blend of jazz, hip-hop, and R&B.

Biography
He came to prominence after being featured on Guru's Jazzmatazz, Vol. 1, released in 1993. He was also one of the artists whose recordings are featured on Stolen Moments: Red Hot + Cool—a compilation album released in 1994 to benefit the Red Hot Organization.

Following 1992's The Antidote, recordings from Jordan have featured on the Billboard charts, especially his acid-jazz Miles Davis cover of "So What", which was a worldwide hit. He was also the recipient of The MOBO Best Jazz Act Award and the Gibson Guitar Best Jazz Guitarist Award. His 2000 release, A Brighter Day, was nominated for the Grammy Award for Best Contemporary Jazz Album.

Jordan's song "The Jackal" (from his 1993 album The Quiet Revolution) gained prominence when actress Allison Janney in the role of C. J. Cregg lip-synched it in the episode "Six Meetings Before Lunch" of The West Wing. She also did so on Arsenio Hall's television show in September 2013.

Jordan died on 13 January 2014. His "body was found at home several days after his return from an overseas tour in South Africa. An autopsy was performed which although inconclusive, confirmed there was no foul play or injury involved."

Discography
 The Antidote (Island, 1992)
 The Quiet Revolution (Island, 1993) AUS No. 48
 Bad Brothers (Island, 1994)
 Light to Dark (Island, 1996)
 A Brighter Day (Blue Note, 2000)
 Off the Record (Blue Note, 2001)
 The Collection (Spectrum, 2002) compilation
 At Last (N-Coded, 2003)
 After 8 (N-Coded, 2004)
 The Rough & The Smooth (Private 'N Public, 2009)

Source:

Singles

References

Further reading

External links
 "So What" Transcription of Ronny Jordan's version of So What

1962 births
2014 deaths
20th-century English musicians
20th-century British guitarists
20th-century British male musicians
21st-century English musicians
21st-century British guitarists
21st-century British male musicians
English funk musicians
English jazz guitarists
English male guitarists
Jazz-funk guitarists
British male jazz musicians
Smooth jazz guitarists
Soul-jazz guitarists